Wendell Oliver Scott (August 29, 1921 – December 23, 1990) was an American stock car racing driver. He was one of the first African-American drivers in NASCAR and the first African-American to win a race in the Grand National Series, NASCAR's highest level.

Scott began his racing career in local circuits and obtained his NASCAR license in around 1953, making him the first African-American ever to compete in NASCAR. He debuted in the Grand National Series on March 4, 1961, in Spartanburg, South Carolina. On December 1, 1963, he won a Grand National Series race at Speedway Park in Jacksonville, Florida, becoming the first black driver to win a race at NASCAR's premier level. Scott's career was repeatedly affected by racial prejudice and problems with top-level NASCAR officials. He was posthumously inducted into the NASCAR Hall of Fame in 2015.

Early life
Scott was born in Danville, Virginia, a town dominated by cotton mills and tobacco-processing plants. Scott vowed as a youth to avoid such labor, and began learning auto mechanics from his father, who worked as a driver and mechanic for two well-to-do white families. Scott also raced bicycles against white children in the neighborhood. As a teen he dropped out of high school, became a taxi driver, and served as a mechanic in the segregated Army in Europe during World War II. He married Mary Coles in 1943; they had seven children.

After the war, he ran an auto-repair shop. As a sideline, he took up the dangerous and illegal pursuit of running moonshine whiskey. The police caught Scott once, in 1949. Sentenced to three years probation, he continued making his late-night whiskey runs.

Racing career
In 1951, the officials at the Dixie Circuit, a regional racing organization, decided to recruit a Black driver as a marketing gimmick. Scott was recruited for this purpose and participated in his first race at the Danville Speedway.

In search of more opportunities, Scott repaired his car with the help of a black mechanic, Hiram Kincaid, and towed it to a NASCAR-sanctioned event in Winston-Salem, North Carolina. Upon arrival, NASCAR officials refused to let him compete due to his race. A few days later he went to another NASCAR event in High Point, North Carolina and received the same result. Scott decided to avoid NASCAR for the time being and race with the Dixie Circuit and at other non-NASCAR speedways. He won his first race at Lynchburg, Virginia, only twelve days into his racing career.

Scott ran as many as five events a week, mostly at Virginia tracks. Some prejudiced drivers would wreck him deliberately though his expertise also won him white fans, even amongst his fellow drivers. These other drivers would serve as his bodyguards at events with racist fans.

Scott began the 1953 season on the Northern Virginia circuit after winning a feature race in Staunton. He subsequently tied the Waynesboro qualifying record and won the Waynesboro feature race. The Waynesboro News Virginian reported that Scott had become "recognized as one of the most popular drivers to appear here." The Staunton News Leader said he "has been among the top drivers in every race here."

In 1954, Scott towed his racecar to a local NASCAR event at the Richmond Speedway and asked the steward, Mike Poston, to grant him a NASCAR license. Poston, a part-timer, was not a powerful figure in NASCAR's hierarchy, but he did have the authority to issue licenses. Scott's license was approved and he became the first Black driver in NASCAR.

Scott won dozens of races during his nine years in regional-level competition. In 1959 he won two championships. NASCAR awarded him the championship title for drivers of sportsman-class stock cars in the state of Virginia, and he also won the track championship in the sportsman class at Richmond's Southside Speedway.

In 1961, he moved up to the Grand National Series.  He achieved the most points for a debutant in 1961. In the 1964 season, he finished 15th in points, and on December 1 of that year, driving a Chevrolet Bel Air that he purchased from Ned Jarrett, he won a race on the half-mile dirt track at Speedway Park in Jacksonville, Florida—the first Grand National event won by an African-American. Scott passed Richard Petty, who was driving an ailing car, with 25 laps remaining for the win. Scott was not announced as the winner of the race at the time. Buck Baker, the second-place driver, was initially declared the winner, but race officials discovered two hours later that Scott had not only won, but was two laps in front of the rest of the field. NASCAR awarded Scott the win afterwards, but his family never received the trophy he had earned until 2021 – nearly 58 years after the race, and 31 years after Scott had died.

He continued to be a competitive driver despite his low-budget operation through the rest of the 1960s. Despite his successes, he never received commercial sponsorship. In 1964, Scott finished 12th in points despite missing several races. Over the next five years, Scott consistently finished in the top ten in the point standings. He finished 11th in points in 1965, was a career-high 6th in 1966, 10th in 1967, and finished 9th in both 1968 and 1969. His top year in winnings was 1969 when he won $47,451.

Scott was forced to retire due to injuries from a racing accident at Talladega, Alabama in 1973, although he did make one more start at the 1973 National 500 in which he finished 12th place. He achieved one win and 147 top ten finishes in 495 career Grand National starts.

Scott died on December 23, 1990 in Danville, Virginia, having suffered from spinal cancer.

Legacy

The film Greased Lightning, starring Richard Pryor as Scott, was loosely based on Scott's biography.

Mojo Nixon, a fellow Danville native, wrote a tribute song titled "The Ballad of Wendell Scott", which appears on Nixon and Skid Roper's 1986 album, Frenzy.

Scott was inducted as a member of the 2000 class of The Virginia Sports Hall of Fame and Museum located in Portsmouth, VA. He also has a street named after him in his hometown of Danville.

Only seven other African-American drivers are known to have started at least one race in what is now the Cup Series: Elias Bowie, Charlie Scott, George Wiltshire, Randy Bethea, Willy T. Ribbs, Bill Lester, and most recently Bubba Wallace.

As reported in the Washington Post, filmmaker John W. Warner began directing a documentary about Scott, titled The Wendell Scott Story, which was to be released in 2003 with narration by the filmmaker's father, former U.S. Senator John Warner but instead Warner created a four-set DVD entitled American Stock: The Golden Era of NASCAR: 1936-to-1971 which documents many racers including Scott. The film included interviews with fellow race-car drivers, including Richard Petty.

Scott is prominently featured in the 1975 book The World's Number One, Flat-Out, All-Time Great Stock Car Racing Book, written by Jerry Bledsoe.

In April 2012, Scott was nominated for inclusion in the NASCAR Hall of Fame, and was selected for induction in the 2015 class, in May 2014.  In January 2013, Scott was awarded his own historical marker in Danville, Virginia. The marker's statement is, “Persevering over prejudice and discrimination, Scott broke racial barriers in NASCAR, with a 13-year career that included 20 top five and 147 top ten finishes.” Scott was inducted into the NASCAR Hall of Fame on January 30, 2015.

Loosely based on him, a fictionalized version of Scott was given a minor role in the 2017 Pixar film Cars 3. He is portrayed by Isiah Whitlock Jr. in the form of an anthropomorphized car, with his name changed to River Scott.

A fictionalized version of Scott early in his career in 1955 was featured heavily on Timeless episode 2, season 2. Portrayed by Joseph Lee Anderson, Scott's history as a smuggler, mechanical and driving ability, perseverance, and past and future injustices due to racial discrimination were major themes of the episode.

Motorsports career results

NASCAR
(key) (Bold – Pole position awarded by qualifying time. Italics – Pole position earned by points standings or practice time. * – Most laps led.)

Grand National Series

Winston Cup Series

Daytona 500

References

External links
Wendell Scott Foundation

Omission of a Nascar Pioneer Stirs a Debate, New York Times, 8/19/09

1921 births
1990 deaths
Sportspeople from Danville, Virginia
People from Danville, Virginia
Racing drivers from Virginia
African-American racing drivers
United States Army personnel of World War II
NASCAR drivers
American Speed Association drivers
Deaths from spinal cancer
Burials in Virginia
African-American United States Army personnel
African-American sportsmen
Deaths from cancer in Virginia
Neurological disease deaths in Virginia
20th-century African-American sportspeople
African Americans in World War II
NASCAR Hall of Fame inductees